In the analytic theory of continued fractions, a chain sequence is an infinite sequence {an} of non-negative real numbers chained together with another sequence {gn} of non-negative real numbers by the equations

where either (a) 0 ≤ gn < 1, or (b) 0 < gn ≤ 1. Chain sequences arise in the study of the convergence problem – both in connection with the parabola theorem, and also as part of the theory of positive definite continued fractions.

The infinite continued fraction of Worpitzky's theorem contains a chain sequence. A closely related theorem shows that

converges uniformly on the closed unit disk |z| ≤ 1 if the coefficients {an} are a chain sequence.

An example

The sequence {¼, ¼, ¼, ...} appears as a limiting case in the statement of Worpitzky's theorem. Since this sequence is generated by setting g0 = g1 = g2 = ...                           = ½, it is clearly a chain sequence. This sequence has two important properties.

Since f(x) = x − x2 is a maximum when x = ½, this example is the "biggest" chain sequence that can be generated with a single generating element; or, more precisely, if {gn} = {x}, and x < ½, the resulting sequence {an} will be an endless repetition of a real number y that is less than ¼.
The choice gn = ½ is not the only set of generators for this particular chain sequence. Notice that setting

generates the same unending sequence {¼, ¼, ¼, ...}.

Notes

References
H. S. Wall, Analytic Theory of Continued Fractions, D. Van Nostrand Company, Inc., 1948; reprinted by Chelsea Publishing Company, (1973), 

Continued fractions